Dongargarh is one of the 90 Legislative Assembly constituencies of Chhattisgarh state in India. It is in Rajnandgaon district and is reserved for candidates belonging to the Scheduled Castes. It is a segment of Rajnandgaon Lok Sabha seat.

Members of Assembly 
 2003 : Vinod Khandekar (BJP)
 2013 : Sarojini Banjare (BJP)

Election results

2003 Assembly Election
 Vinod Khandekar (BJP) : 55,188 votes  
 Dhanesh Patila (INC) : 40,711

2013 Assembly Election
 Sarojini Banjare (BJP) : 67,158 votes  
 Dr.Thaneshwar Patila (INC) : 62,474

2018 Assembly Election

See also
List of constituencies of the Chhattisgarh Legislative Assembly
Rajnandgaon district

References 

Rajnandgaon district
Assembly constituencies of Chhattisgarh